Andrew George Robson (born 27 April 1971) is an English former cricketer. Robson was a right-handed batsman who bowled right-arm fast-medium. He was born at East Boldon, County Durham.

Robson made his debut for Surrey in a List A match against Derbyshire in the 1990 Refuge Assurance League, in what was his only appearance in 1990. The following season, he made his first-class debut against Essex in the County Championship at the County Ground, Chelmsford. He made a further first-class appearance for the county in 1991, against Kent. He also made three List A appearances in the Refuge Assurance League against Kent, Lancashire and Hampshire. In four List A matches for Surrey, he took 8 wickets at an average of 20.62, with best figures of 3/42. With opportunities limited at Surrey, Robson proceeded to join Surrey for the 1992 season, making his first-class debut for his new county against Hampshire in the County Championship, with him making four further first-class appearances in that season, the last of which came against Durham. In five first-class matches for Sussex, he took 8 wickets at an average of 50.62, with best figures of 4/37. In his only season with Sussex, he did feature more in limited overs cricket, making fifteen List A appearances, the last of which came against Hampshire in the 1992 Sunday League. In his limited overs appearances for Sussex, he took a total of 12 wickets at an average of 36.08, with best figures of 2/14.

He later made two appearances for Northumberland in the 1995 Minor Counties Championship, against Hertfordshire and Buckinghamshire.

References

External links
Andy Robson at ESPNcricinfo
Andy Robson at CricketArchive

1971 births
Living people
People from The Boldons
Cricketers from Tyne and Wear
English cricketers
Surrey cricketers
Sussex cricketers
Northumberland cricketers